Sébastien Delogu (born 8 June 1987) is a French politician of La France Insoumise who has been representing Bouches-du-Rhône's 7th constituency in the National Assembly since 2022.

See also 

 List of deputies of the 16th National Assembly of France

References 

Living people
1973 births
People from Marseille
French taxi drivers
Deputies of the 16th National Assembly of the French Fifth Republic
21st-century French politicians
La France Insoumise politicians
Members of Parliament for Bouches-du-Rhône